Hugo Centeno Jr. (born February 19, 1991) is an American professional boxer. He is managed by Al Haymon.

Amateur career
Centeno had a record of 90-9 as an amateur.

Professional career
On September 17, 2010 Centeno beat the veteran Hector Rivera at the Nido Sport Center in Mexicali, Baja California, Mexico.

Professional boxing record 

| style="text-align:center;" colspan="8"|27 Wins (14 knockouts, 13 decisions),  3 Losses (2 knockouts, 1 decisions), 1 Draws, 1 No Contest
|-  style="text-align:center; background:#e3e3e3;"
|  style="border-style:none none solid solid; "|Res.
|  style="border-style:none none solid solid; "|Record
|  style="border-style:none none solid solid; "|Opponent
|  style="border-style:none none solid solid; "|Type
|  style="border-style:none none solid solid; "|Rd., Time
|  style="border-style:none none solid solid; "|Date
|  style="border-style:none none solid solid; "|Location
|  style="border-style:none none solid solid; "|Notes
|- align=center
|Loss
|27-3 (1)
|align=left| Willie Monroe Jr.
|
|
|
|style="text-align:left;"| 
|style="text-align:left;"|
|- align=center
|Win
|27-2 (1)
|align=left| Oscar Cortes
|
|
|
|style="text-align:left;"| 
|style="text-align:left;"|
|- align=center
|Loss
|26-2 (1)
|align=left| Jermall Charlo
|
|
|
|style="text-align:left;"| 
|style="text-align:left;"|
|- align=center
|Win
|26-1 (1)
|align=left| Immanuwel Aleem
|
|
|
|align=left|
|align=left|

|- align=center
|Win
|25-1 (1)
|align=left| Ronald Montes
|
|
|
|align=left|
|align=left|

|- align=center
|Loss
|24-1 (1)
|align=left| Maciej Sulęcki
|
|
|
|align=left|
|align=left|

|- align=center
|Win
|24-0 (1)
|align=left| Josue Ovando
|
|
|
|align=left|
|align=left|

|- align=center
|Win
|23-0 (1)
|align=left| Lukas Maciec
|
|
|
|align=left|
|align=left|
|- align=center
|Win
|22-0 (1)
|align=left| James de la Rosa
|
|
|
|align=left|
|align=left|
|- align=center
|Win
|align=center|21-0 (1)||align=left| Gerardo Ibarra
|
|
|
|align=left|
|align=left|
|- align=center
|Win
|align=center|20-0 (1)||align=left| Angel Osuna
|
|
|
|align=left|
|align=left|
|- align=center
|style="background:#ddd;"|NC
|align=center|19-0 (1)||align=left| Julian Williams
|
|
|
|align=left|
|align=left|
|- align=center
|Win
|align=center|19-0||align=left| Isaac Mendez
|
|
|
|align=left|
|align=left|
|- align=center
|Win
|align=center|18-0||align=left| KeAndrae Leatherwood
|
|
|
|align=left|
|align=left|
|- align=center
|Win
|align=center|17-0||align=left| Allen Conyers
|
|
|
|align=left|
|align=left|
|- align=center
|Win
|align=center|16-0||align=left| Justin Williams
|
|
|
|align=left|
|align=left|
|- align=center
|Win
|align=center|15-0||align=left| Ayi Bruce
|
|
|
|align=left|
|align=left|
|- align=center
|Win
|align=center|14-0||align=left| Rahman Mustafa Yusubov
|
|
|
|align=left|
|align=left|
|- align=center
|Win
|align=center|13-0||align=left| Gerardo Cesar Prieto
|
|
|
|align=left|
|align=left|
|- align=center
|Win
|align=center|12-0||align=left| Octavio Narvaez
|
|
|
|align=left|
|align=left|
|- align=center
|Win
|align=center|11-0||align=left| David Lopez
|
|
|
|align=left|
|align=left|
|- align=center
|Win
|align=center|10-0||align=left| Hector Orozco
|
|
|
|align=left|
|align=left|
|- align=center
|Win
|align=center|9-0||align=left| Alfredo Rivera
|
|
|
|align=left|
|align=left|
|- align=center
|Win
|align=center|8-0||align=left| Kelly Wright
|
|
|
|align=left|
|align=left|
|- align=center
|Win
|align=center|7-0||align=left| Jovanni Rubio
|
|
|
|align=left|
|align=left|
|- align=center
|Win
|align=center|6-0||align=left| Jesus Vallejo
|
|
|
|align=left|
|align=left|
|- align=center
|Win
|align=center|5-0||align=left| Hector Rivera
|
|
|
|align=left|
|align=left|
|- align=center
|Win
|align=center|4-0||align=left| David Orozco
|
|
|
|align=left|
|align=left|
|- align=center
|Win
|align=center|3-0||align=left| Mario Evangelista
|
|
|
|align=left|
|align=left|
|- align=center
|Win
|align=center|2-0||align=left| John Dunham
|
|
|
|align=left|
|align=left|
|- align=center
|Win
|align=center|1-0|| align=left| Alan Lopez
|
|||
|align=left|
|align=left|
|}

References

External links

American boxers of Mexican descent
Boxers from California
Welterweight boxers
1991 births
Living people
American male boxers
People from Oxnard, California
Sportspeople from Ventura County, California